Ratkovci is a small village in the Municipality of Moravske Toplice in the Prekmurje region of Slovenia.

Geography
The population is scattered along the valley of Ratkovci Creek and the road linking Prosenjakovci with Križevci. The shallow valley is dominated by meadows with fields on gentle, sunny slopes and forests at higher elevations. The farms are small, with honey production and dairying being the main economic activities. Most villagers are employed in Prosenjakovci.

Cultural heritage
There is a three-story wooden belfry in the village, built in 1987 to replace an older structure.

Notable residents
Ratkovci is the birthplace of the Hungarian Slovenian priest and writer Péter Kollár.

References

External links
 Ratkovci on Geopedia

Populated places in the Municipality of Moravske Toplice